U-120 may refer to one of the following German submarines:

 , a Type UE II submarine launched in 1918 that served in the First World War and was surrendered in 1918
 During the First World War, Germany also had this submarine with a similar name:
 , a Type UB III submarine launched in 1918 and surrendered in 1918
 , a Type IIB submarine that served in the Second World War and was scuttled on 2 May 1945

Submarines of Germany